The Coupe de France's results of the 1961–62 season. AS Saint-Étienne won the final played on May 13, 1962, beating FC Nancy.

Round of 16

Quarter-finals

Semi-finals

Final

References

French federation

1961–62 domestic association football cups
1961–62 in French football
1961-62